Pip's Original Doughnuts & Chai, or simply Pip's Original, is a doughnut shop in Portland, Oregon. Nate Snell is a co-owner.

Description 
Pip's is a doughnut shop on Fremont Street in northeast Portland. Vogue has said the shop has an "always out-the-door line".

History 
In 2016, a job posting for the business upset some local vegetarians and vegans. In 2017, Pip's gave away doughnuts to benefit the Immigrant and Refugee Community Organization. A driver crashed into the shop in 2019. During the COVID-19 pandemic, when indoor seating was banned, Pip's focused on chai. 

Pip's gives a dozen small doughnuts to people celebrating their birthday, as of 2020.

Reception 

KGW included Pip's in a 2019 list of the "5 top spots for doughnuts in Portland", describing the shop as "the most popular doughnut spot in Portland, boasting 4.5 stars out of 2,141 reviews on Yelp". Similarly, KOIN included the business in a 2019 list of doughnut shops and called the small doughnuts "a Portland favorite". Zoe Baillargeon included Pip's in Portland Monthly's 2021 list of the city's ten best chais. 

Nick Townsend included Pip's in Eater Portland's 2021 list of "11 Places to Find Charming Chai Lattes in Portland". Townsend and Brooke Jackson-Glidden also included Pip's in a 2021 overview of "Portland's Standout Doughnut Shops". Alex Frane named Pip's in Thrillist's 2021 overview of the city's "absolute best" doughnut shops.

See also

 List of doughnut shops

References

External links 

 

Cully, Portland, Oregon
Doughnut shops in the United States
Restaurants in Portland, Oregon